Donald James Burrows (born 28 December 1945, in London) is Professor of Music at the Open University, and a leading scholar of the music of George Frideric Handel.

He read History and Music at Trinity Hall, Cambridge (BA 1968; PGCE 1969; MA 1971).
He completed his PhD at the Open University in 1981.
He is vice-president of the Händel-Gesellschaft, and chairman of the Handel Institute.

Awards
2000 Handel Prize

Works
"Reading the Metre", Musicology and sister disciplines, International Musicological Society. Oxford University Press, 2000,

References

English musicologists
1945 births
Alumni of Trinity Hall, Cambridge
Alumni of the Open University
Academics of the Open University
Living people
Handel Prize winners